Muter is a surname. Notable people with the surname include:

Bill Muter (born 1984), American musician, educator, and author
George Muter (died 1810), American settler
Joseph Muter (1780–1840), British soldier of the Napoleonic Wars
Mela Muter (1876–1967), Jewish painter